The 2014 Atlantic 10 Conference men's soccer season will be the 19th season of men's varsity soccer in the conference.

 
Atlantic 10 Conference men's soccer